Lachlan Ryan Barr (born 24 September 1994) is an Australian professional footballer who plays as a central defender for A-League Men club Adelaide United.

Early and personal life
Barr was born in London, England.

Career
Barr played youth football for Westland United and Adelaide United. He played senior football for White City in the 2013, 2014 and 2015 seasons. After a spell in Germany with Internationale Berlin, which he combined with working in an ice cream parlour, he moved to English club Bradford City in July 2017.

Barr joined Harrogate Town on loan in November 2017, alongside teammate Ellis Hudson. He scored on his debut for the club, in the FA Trophy, but did not make a league appearance for them.

Upon his return to Australia, Lachlan signed for MetroStars in the FFSA NPL, where he won the club's Player of the Year award in his first season. He moved to Heidelberg United for the 2020 season. He signed for Adelaide City in August 2020.

He moved to Adelaide United in December 2021. On 9 June 2022 he signed a two year deal with the club transitioning from an injury replacement contract.

References

1994 births
Living people
Australian soccer players
Adelaide United FC players
FK Beograd (Australia) players
Bradford City A.F.C. players
Harrogate Town A.F.C. players
National Premier Leagues players
English Football League players
Association football defenders
Australian expatriate soccer players
Australian expatriate sportspeople in England
Expatriate footballers in England
North Eastern MetroStars SC players
Heidelberg United FC players
Adelaide City FC players
A-League Men players